The Schools' Head of the River Race (SHORR) is the UK's largest school-age processional (head rowing) race and is organised by Westminster School for crews aged between 14 and 18 years old.  It is held in Spring, the end of the head race season.

The race forms a leg of the national kudos of winning a rowing 'triple' in which occasionally an undefeated Junior Eight (J18 8+ or WJ18 8+) wins this race, the National Schools Regatta, and either the Princess Elizabeth Challenge Cup at Henley Royal Regatta or the Peabody Cup at Henley Women's Regatta.

Course

The race is held annually on the River Thames in London, England, on a course from Chiswick Bridge in Mortlake to Westminster School Boat Club flagpole in Putney. It is rowed with the tide and is in the opposite direction to The Boat Race.

Race format

History
When the race was first held in 1946 the course was shorter than at present, from above Hammersmith Bridge to the current finishing post, a distance of approximately 1.75 miles. The start was moved to Chiswick Bridge in 2000, resulting in a course almost the length of the full Boat Race

After the course was lengthened, the Schools' Head continued to offer a shorter course (from  London Corinthian Sailing Club above Hammermsith Bridge) for smaller boats, such as J15 4s, J15 B 8's, and Maiden 4s; however, in 2009 this was changed by C.D. Riches, the event's manager.

Eton College have won the race a total of 14 times, followed by Emanuel School with 11 wins (including an unprecedented eight in nine years from 1962-1970), Hampton School with 9 and St Paul's with 9. In addition to these, the headship in 2000 was shared in an unprecedented three-way tie between Hampton, St Paul's and Canford School.

Current format
The race is the largest head race of the winter season by junior crews. It attracts around 300 crews each year. Composite crews, drawn from more than one club or school, are not permitted.

All categories race the same course.

In 2012, the J4- and WJ4- events were introduced.

In 2013, the Mix 4x event was introduced to the race.

In 2017, the course was considerably shortened on the day, retaining the usual start line but finishing at the bandstand shortly after Barnes bridge.

In 2020, the race was cancelled due to the COVID-19 pandemic and the restrictions on 'non-essential' contact.

In 2021, as a result of the ongoing pandemic, a 'virtual' Schools' Head event was run with crews submitting GPS recordings on their home stretches of water.

Records

The current record holders for the events are:

Men's events

Women's events

Mixed events

Winners of all categories when last held

Previous J18 eights winners

Previous J18 Women eights winners

See also
Rowing on the River Thames

Notes and references
Notes 
  
  
References

External links
 Official Website

Mortlake, London
Rowing on the River Thames
Head races
Water sports in London
Westminster School
Scholastic rowing in the United Kingdom